Abalessa is a town and commune in Tamanrasset Province, in southern Algeria, coextensive with the district of the same name. According to the 2008 census it has a population of 9,163 up from 6,484 in 1998, with an annual growth rate of 3.6%. The postcode of the town is 11120.

History

The former capital of the Ahaggar, Abalessa is famous for the Tin Hinan Tomb. This 1,500 year old monumental grave is dedicated to the Tuareg matriarch Tin Hinan, and vestiges of a Tifinagh inscription have been found on one of its walls. According to Henri Lhote, the edifice may have built on top of an earlier Roman castrum since its architecture is different from the surrounding tombs and similar to that used by the Roman legionaries to construct their desert fortifications.

On 18 October 1927, Byron Khun de Prorok discovered a vault near Abalessa containing a skeleton, belonging to a woman, and her furniture. In his book Mysterious Sahara: The Land of Gold, of Sand, and of Ruin Khun de Prorok attributed the skeleton to Tin Hinan. Today, the skeleton is on display at the Bardo Museum in Algiers, while the monument where it was discovered continues to be a popular tourist attraction in Abalessa among visitors to the Tamanrasset.

Geography

There is significant vegetation in the river valleys; the area belongs to the West Saharan montane xeric woodlands ecoregion.

Transportation

The N55A national highway, which branches off from the Trans-Sahara Highway (route N1) at Tit, is the main road through the area, passing just south of Abalessa.

Education

4.6% of the population has a tertiary education, and another 12.4% has completed secondary education. The overall literacy rate is 78.7%, and is 85.4% among males and 70.8% among females.

Localities
The commune is composed of eight localities:

Abalessa
Silet
Iglène
Tefert El Fougania
Tefert El Tahtania
Tin Amansagh
Daghmouli
Issalissekine
Tahart
In Azarou

References

Neighbouring towns and cities

Communes of Tamanrasset Province